During the 1978–79 English football season, Leicester City F.C. competed in the Football League Second Division.

Season summary
In the 1978–79 season, Jock Wallace left Rangers to become Leicester's new boss following the Foxes' relegation from the First Division. It was a disappointing season for the Foxes but were not helped by lack of finances to sign quality players but the only positive from the season was that Wallace had to use youth policy and play some youngsters and it brought some success in results. Despite that they finished the season in 17th place.

Final league table

Results summary

Results by round

Results
Leicester City's score comes first

Legend

Football League Second Division

FA Cup

League Cup

Squad

References

Leicester City F.C. seasons
Leicester City